Jean Castellini (born 21 January 1968) is a Monegasque businessman and civil servant. 

Castellini took over as Counsellor of Finance and Economy in December 2012. 

Castellini graduated from École des Hautes Études Commerciales and from Haas School of Business, Berkeley. He was Councillor in the Prince’s Cabinet from 2006 to 2007, and secretary general of the Commission for the Control of Financial Activities from 2007 to 2009. He was managing director of Monegasque Safra Bank from 2009 until his appointment as Counsellor of Finance and Economy.

Personal life
Castellini is married, and he has three children.

References

1968 births
Living people
Monegasque politicians
Monegasque bankers
Finance ministers of Monaco
HEC Paris alumni